Greenery may refer to:

 Any foliage of a plant, either live, freshly cut, or artificial. The term is used in the landscaping, interior design, and florist industries.
 A houseplant used for its foliage.
 A slang term for marijuana.